Bao'an District is one of the nine districts comprising the city of Shenzhen, Guangdong province.  It is one of the districts formerly lying outside the Shenzhen Special Economic Zone.

History
Bao'an was the historical name of Bao'an County (also known as Xin'an County) of the Qing dynasty, which included area of modern-day Shenzhen and Hong Kong. The area of today Bao'an District, was integrated into Shenzhen in 1979, which the Bao'an County was promoted as a city.

Bao'an was reverted into county status in 1981, as the administrative unit of the area that belongs to Shenzhen, but now belongs to Shenzhen Special Economic Zone. Border patrols were also established in the border of the Economic Zone. In 1991, Shenzhen Bao'an International Airport, located in Bao'an County, was opened.

Finally Bao'an district was established on January 1, 1993. Two New Districts were created as sub-districts of Bao'an district, namely Guangming and Longhua new districts, in 2007 and 2011 respectively.

In 2010, Shenzhen Special Economic Zone was enlarged to cover the whole Shenzhen city. Rapid development occurred in the Bao'an District. Longhua District was separated from Bao'an and became a district on 11 October 2016. In 2018, Guangming District was also separated from Bao'an District.

Demographics
The district had a population of 4,476,554 by November, 2020. About 85% of Bao'an's population are migrants from other parts of China, most speaking Standard Chinese (Standard Mandarin). Hence this made Standard Chinese the primary Chinese variety spoken in the district. Cantonese is also widely spoken, between locals and migrants from around Guangdong Province (Canton Province).

Public Safety
Bao'an has, as of 2008, a notoriously bad safety record. Since the turn of the millennium, the district has seen a string of high-profile abductions, robberies, and other cases of violent crime. However, in the last four years, this has become less of an issue with an increased police presence and higher average income in the district.

Subdistricts
Bao'an District comprises ten subdistricts:

Economy
Bao'an is predominantly a secondary sector economy as industrial center famous for having a concentration electronics factories, mostly in Xixiang and Guanlan sub-districts. There is also a sizable service industry. Agriculture, which used to dominate the economy, has diminished in recent years. Like many parts of Shenzhen, high-rises can be found all over Bao'an.

Four airlines are headquartered on the grounds of Shenzhen Bao'an International Airport: Shenzhen Airlines, Jade Cargo International, Shenzhen Donghai Airlines, and SF Airlines.

Transportation
Shenzhen Bao'an International Airport is situated in this district. Guangzhou–Shenzhen intercity railway also travel through the district. Shenzhen metro lines 1, 5, 6, 11, 12 and 20 go through the district at some point.

Regional Railway

  Shenzhen Airport, Shenzhen Airport North, Fuhai West, Shajing West

Shenzhen Metro
Bao'an is currently served by six metro lines operated by Shenzhen Metro:

   - Xin'an, Bao'an Center , Bao'an Stadium, Pingzhou, Xixiang, Gushu, Hourui, Airport East 
   - Baohua, Bao'an Center , Fanshen, Lingzhi , Honglang North, Xingdong
   - Songgang , Xitou, Songgang Park, Shangwu, Guantian
   - Bitou, Songgang , Houting, Shajing, Ma'an Hill, Tangwei, Qiaotou, Fuyong , Airport North , Airport, Bihaiwan, Bao'an
   - Xin'an Park, Lingzhi , Shangchuan, Liutang, Bao'an Passenger Transport Terminal, Baotian 1st Road, Pingluan Hill, Xixiang Taoyuan, Zhongwu South, Huangtian, Xingwei, Airport East , Fuwei, Huaide, Fuyong , Qiaotou West, Fuhai West, Shenzhen World , Shenzhen World North , Waterlands Resort South, Waterlands Resort East
   - Convention & Exhibition City, Shenzhen World North , Shenzhen World , Shenzhen World South, Airport North

Education

Primary schools include:
 Xiwan Primary School

Schools operated by the Shenzhen Municipal government
 Shenzhen No. 7 Senior High School (深圳市第七高级中学) - Shajing Subdistrict

See also

Bao'an Stadium

References

External links

Bao'an District Government Official website
Bao'an District Government Official website  

 
Districts of Shenzhen